Kotana railway station is a railway station on Ahmedabad–Udaipur Line under the Ajmer railway division of North Western Railway zone. This is situated at Kotana, Pipalada, Dungarpur in Dungarpur district of the Indian state of Rajasthan.

References

Ajmer railway division
Railway stations in Dungarpur district
Railway stations in India opened in 1879